Mohkam Singh (6 June 1663 – 7 December 1704 or 1705), born Mohkam Chand (his given name is also transliterated as Muhkam or Mohkhum), one of the Panj Pyare or the Five Beloved of honoured memory in the Sikh tradition, was the son of Tirath Chandi and Devi Bai, from Bet Dwarka (modern-day Gujarat, India). He was born into the Chhimba caste.

In about the year 1685, he came to Anandpur, then the seat of Guru Gobind Singh. He practised martial arts and took part in Sikhs battles with the surrounding hill chiefs and imperial troops. He was one of the five who offered their heads in response to Guru Gobind Singh's call on the Baisakhi day of 1699 and earned the appellation of Panj Pyare. Initiated into the order of the Khalsa, Mohkam Chand received the common surname of Singh and became Mohkam Singh. Bhai Mohkam Singh died in the battle of Chamkaur on 7 December 1704 or 1705 with Bhai Himmat Singh and Bhai Sahib Singh.

In older sources, he was the second position of the original Panj Pyare. However, later sources moved him down to fourth in-position and replaced the second position with Dharam Singh.

References 

Kuir Singh, Gurbilas Patshahi 10. Patiala, 1968
Chhibbar, Kesar Singh, Bansavalinama Dasan Patshahian Kd. Chandigarh, 1972
Gian Singh, Giani, Sri Guru Panth Prakash. Patiala, 1970

Sikh martyrs
Sikh warriors
1663 births
1705 deaths
People from Gujarat